Cabot was a council ward that covered the centre of Bristol, England. It took its name from the Cabot Tower, a memorial tower on Brandon Hill that was built to commemorate John Cabot's voyage and "discovery" of North America. The ward was abolished in 2016.

Areas
This ward contained the whole of the medieval city and many of the oldest surviving buildings. Cabot includes Bristol's Docks, the City Centre and the University of Bristol. Cabot has at least 17 churches, a cathedral, a synagogue, four museums, three hospitals, two theatres, two concert halls, and art galleries and cinemas.

Areas within Cabot include: Spike Island, Baltic Wharf, Redcliffe Hill, Queen Square, Baldwin St, the City Centre, the Old City, Broadmead, Canon's Marsh, Brandon Hill, Park St, Bristol University, Kingsdown, Dove St, the east side of Whiteladies Road, the south side of Cotham Hill and Cotham Brow, and the west side of Stokes Croft.

The area that comprises Brandon Hill, Park St, the Triangle, and the area between Park Row and the Hippodrome has been promoted under the name "The West End".

Bristol city centre

The central area of the city of Bristol is the area south of the central ring road and north of the Floating Harbour, bordered north by St Pauls and Easton, east by Temple Meads and Redcliffe, and west by Clifton and Canons' Marsh. It is contained entirely within the Council ward of Cabot.

Canon's Marsh

Canons' Marsh is an inner city area of approximately one square kilometre, on the north side of the Floating Harbour, immediately to the west of the River Frome spur (St Augustine's Reach) of the harbour. Canons' Marsh borders Hotwells to the west, Clifton to the north, and the city centre to the north east. It was a shipbuilding area until the last yard closed in 1904, incorporating two of Teast's Docks, and including J&W Peters shipyard.

Canons' Wharf was once one of the busiest quays in the docks, with its own branch of the Bristol Harbour Railway, cranes and a goods shed. The area was also the location of the city's gas works. With the decline of industry throughout the 20th century, Canons' Marsh was cleared to make way for urban renewal. Due to pollution, however, the gas works remained derelict for several years. The area is now the location of We the Curious, the South West offices of Lloyds Bank, a campus of City of Bristol College and several bars, restaurants, apartment buildings and offices.

Kingsdown

Kingsdown is a mainly residential area of Bristol, located to the north of the city centre and south of Cotham.

Redcliffe

A small portion of the Redcliffe area lies within the Cabot ward; most of it, however, lies in the Lawrence Hill ward.

Spike Island

Spike Island is the narrow strip of land between the Floating Harbour to the north and the tidal New Cut of the River Avon to the south, from the dock entrance to the west to Bathurst Basin in the east. From the digging of the "New Cut" until the Bathurst locks were sealed up, it was literally an island.

Tyndall's Park

Tyndall's Park is an area to the east of Clifton. It contains the main precinct of the University of Bristol, Bristol Grammar School and the BBC Bristol studios.

Statistics
In the 2001 Census Cabot ward had a resident population of 9,604. The population is generally young, student/professional and in rented accommodation. The ward was in the Parliamentary constituency of Bristol West (held by Thangam Debbonaire), and had two councillors: Mark Wright and Ani Stafford-Townsend. As of 2009/10, Cabot had the highest crime rate per resident of any ward in the city, with more than double the offences per head of any other ward.

Fate 
Cabot ceased to exist as a ward in 2016, its area being allocated to Hotwells and Harbourside Ward Ward and Central Ward following boundary changes.

References

External links

 Census data
 Ward map
 Map of the area circa 1900

Wards of Bristol